Results from the 1980 Monaco Grand Prix Formula Three held at Monte Carlo on May 17, 1980, in the Circuit de Monaco.

Classification 

Monaco Grand Prix Formula Three